TNA Wrestling is a 2008 video game for Verizon Wireless devices by Canadian developer Longtail Studios. It is based on the professional wrestling promotion Total Nonstop Action Wrestling (TNA). Unlike most other professional wrestling games, the gameplay in TNA Wrestling is based on turn-based strategy with role-playing elements. The game garnered largely positive reviews and was re-released in early 2009 for iOS. It is no longer available for download on the iTunes Store and has been superseded by an unrelated game released by Namco Bandai called TNA Wrestling Impact!.

Gameplay

The core of the game is its story mode, which allows players to create their own wrestler and take him through his professional wrestling career. Players start out backyard wrestling and work their way through the ranks of TNA, fighting and interacting with other wrestlers and crafting either a heroic or villainous personality. The player character is gradually leveled up to gain experience points, which can be used to acquire new moves. In addition to the story mode, a quick match option is available offering several different match types and the ability to play as actual members of the TNA roster.

During matches, wrestlers take turns attacking. Moves are selected via a menu and can be used in combos. Powerful special moves are also available and can be executed through quick time events.

Reception

The game received favorable reviews according to the review aggregation website GameRankings. Chris Plante of UGO Networks gave it an A−, lauding the turn-based gameplay as a good fit for mobile devices and praising the game's story mode and customization features. Levi Buchanan of IGN was not as positive, saying that the match gameplay was not fun and that the game is "A better RPG than a wrestling game." However, he did praise the game's story mode as "very well-written." Brad Nicholson of Destructoid gave a favorable review of the game. While citing the match gameplay as a weak point of the title, he also praised the game's story mode.

See also

List of licensed wrestling video games

References

External links

2008 video games
Impact Wrestling video games
IOS games
IOS-only games
Video games developed in Canada